The Fiat 1300 and Fiat 1500 are a series of front-engine, rear-drive automobiles manufactured and marketed by Fiat from 1961 to 1967, replacing the Fiat 1400 and Fiat 1200 coupé, spyder and cabriolet. The 1300 and 1500 were essentially identical to each other except for their engine displacement, as indicated by their model names, and were offered in sedan/saloon, station wagon, convertible and coupé body styles which shared little mechanically with the other body styles except the 1500 engine.

The 1500 offered a 75 hp engine, lightweight construction, front disc brakes and rear alloy drum brakes.

The 1300/1500 and their derivatives were also assembled by Yugoslavia's Zastava and Fiat's German subsidiary, Neckar Automobil AG, as well as in South Africa. The floorpan of the 1500 C was used as a basis for the 1500s replacement, the Fiat 125, while another model, the Polski Fiat 125p, made by the Polish FSO, was created by mating the body of 125 and mechanicals (engines, gearbox, transmission, suspension) of 1300/1500. In the Italian range, the 1300 was replaced by the Fiat 124 in 1966, and the 1500 by the Fiat 125 a year later.

In total, 1,900,000 units were produced worldwide.

Drivetrain
The 1300/1500 were conventional cars, with longitudinally, front-mounted engines powering the rear axle via a four-speed manual transmission with a column gearchange. The engines employed were two versions of the same design, differing mainly in bore:
 Fiat 1300 - 1295 cc (bore 72 x stroke 79.5 mm) OHV 4-cyl inline  at 5000 rpm
 Fiat 1500 - 1481 cc (bore 77 x stroke 79.5 mm) OHV 4-cyl inline  at 5400 rpm
Both engines had alloy cylinder heads with twin rocker shafts and inlet valves angled at 45 degrees

An innovative feature at the time was the fitting of disc brakes on the front.

This longer version was called the 1500 C and also received three more horsepower (for a total of 75) and various other detail differences, including power brakes and bigger taillights with built-in reverse lamps.

The Pininfarina-designed Coupé and Cabriolet models of the preceding 1200 continued with largely unchanged bodywork, although they were now equipped with the larger 1.5 litre engine. The O.S.C.A. engined 1600 S Coupé and Cabriolet also continued to be available. All of the coupés and convertibles were replaced by the new 124 coupés and spiders in 1966.

The New Zealand importer, Torino Motors, marketed the 1500 as the "Crusader", with corresponding badging. In South Africa, dealers could also supply the "1500 OTS", a conversion for more power available in two different stages. The OTS was developed by CMI (Cartoria Motor Industries) specifically to suit local production car competition regulations. Rather than the standard car's  SAE, the OTS developed  SAE in the respective Stage I and Stage II variants. A variety of extras were also offered, including lowered suspension and a conversion to a floor-mounted shifter.

Fiat 1500 L / 1500 Taxi

These models were essentially Fiat 1800s fitted with the 1500 engine, and therefore referred to as "1500" in Fiat nomenclature. The 1500 L (for "Lunga" - Italian for "long") originally had the same  engine as the regular 1500, and in 1964 was upgraded to  along with the Fiat 1500 C.

Other manufacturers’ versions

Seat 1500

The Seat 1500 was a car unrelated to the Fiat 1500. It was instead, as the Italian Fiat 1500 L, an underengined version of the Fiat 1800/2100. It was built in Barcelona, where 183,652 were produced between 1963 and 1975.

Siata 1500 TS
Moreover, there was a 1500 TS Coupé version with a unique body designed by Giovanni Michelotti. Both the saloon and the coupé were also manufactured by Fiat's German subsidiary, Neckar Automobil AG, formerly known as NSU-Fiat, located in Heilbronn (unlike regular Fiat 1300/1500).

Zastava 1300 and 1500
The Yugoslavian automaker Zastava, which was extensively cooperating with Fiat, also assembled the 1300 and 1500, branding them as Zastava 1300 and Zastava 1500, respectively. Zastava went on to produce the 1300 by itself when Fiat in 1967 stopped production. During the seventies better equipment was added and models named DeLuxe and 1300E. The production finished in December 1979. 201,160 copies were made since 1961. The car was nicknamed Tristać (trista means 300 in Serbian language.). The saloon model in the Zastava's version is the same as in the Fiat's version, but the estate model is different. This model is used as the foundation of the Fiat 1300/1500's successor, Fiat 124.

With all-around disc brakes, rear-wheel drive, up to 72 horsepower (the engine could propel the car to a top speed of 155 km/h), the elegant Tristać was Yugoslavia's favorite upmarket car. The Zastava 1300 was also assembled by Leonidas Lara (C.C.A.) in Bogotá, Colombia. Assembly of Zastavas in Colombia began as early as 1969.

Argentinian Fiat 1500

For South American market Fiat Concord in Buenos Aires from 1963 produced a 1500 version. This was available as "Berlina", "Familiar," and in a pick-up version with three seats in the front row named "Multicarga". A total of 123,059 examples were produced. A Vignale-bodied coupé version, very rare in Europe, was more common in Argentina where 5,228 units were built between 1966 and 1970. These four-seater coupés differed in minor ways from the Vignale coupés built in Italy and provided the basis for the 1969 1600 Sport, a fastback coupé that eventually developed into the Argentina-only 125 Sport. These later versions no longer required Fiat Concord to pay (steep) royalties to Vignale. The 1600 received an enlarged version of the 1500's engine, displacing 1625 cc.

Polski Fiat 125p
Although considered a variant of Fiat 125, the Polski Fiat 125p was actually a combination of bodywork of Fiat 125 and engines and mechanicals of Fiat 1300/1500.

References

Notes

Bibliography

External links

1300 1500
Mid-size cars
Rear-wheel-drive vehicles
Sedans
Station wagons
Cars introduced in 1961